John Noel Laughton Isaac (died 3 September 1939) was a British solicitor and the first British serviceman to die during World War II. He was a pilot in the Royal Air Force Volunteer Reserve, and died when his plane crashed at Hendon.

Isaac was born in Dinas Powys, Glamorgan, Wales.

References

Date of birth missing
1939 deaths
British solicitors
Royal Air Force personnel killed in World War II
Royal Air Force Volunteer Reserve personnel of World War II
Royal Air Force pilots of World War II
People from the Vale of Glamorgan